The redpolls (genus Acanthis) (in Great Britain also historically known as redpoles) are a group of small passerine birds in the finch family Fringillidae, which have characteristic red markings on their heads. They are placed in the genus Acanthis. The genus name Acanthis is from the Ancient Greek akanthis, a name for a small now-unidentifiable bird.

All redpolls are northern breeding woodland species, associated with birch trees (although there are introduced populations in the southern hemisphere, in New Zealand and nearby subantarctic islands). They are small birds, brown or grey-brown above and with a red forehead patch. The adult male's breast is washed in red, but in females and young birds the buff breast and white belly are streaked with brown. The bill is small and yellow. Some birds, particularly young ones, are difficult to assign to species.

They are primarily seed-eaters, and often feed acrobatically like a tit; their diet may include some insects in summer. They have a dry reeling song and a metallic call. They lay four to seven eggs in a nest in a tree or, in the case of the Arctic redpoll, a large bush. They can form large flocks outside the breeding season, sometimes mixed with other finches.

Taxonomy
The taxonomy of redpolls is unsettled, with several different very closely related forms of redpolls which have been considered as anything from one to five species. Some studies favour three species, but this is certainly not definite. Global lists currently support either two species (the common and hoary redpoll) or a single species (the common redpoll). Most recently, genomewide analyses found differences in gene expression but no genetic divergence, suggesting that plumage forms have originated recently, within a single interbreeding lineage, and do not represent species boundaries.

Species
The species are:

References

Further reading
 Knox, A. G., and P. E. Lowther (2000). Hoary Redpoll (Carduelis hornemanni). In The Birds of North America, No. 544 (A. Poole and F. Gill, eds.). The Birds of North America, Inc., Philadelphia, PA.
 Knox, A. G., and P. E. Lowther (2000). Common Redpoll (Carduelis flammea). In The Birds of North America, No. 543 (A. Poole and F. Gill, eds.). The Birds of North America, Inc., Philadelphia, PA.

External links

Common redpoll species account - Cornell Lab of Ornithology
Common redpoll - Carduelis flammea - USGS Patuxent Bird Identification InfoCenter

Birds of Canada
Birds of North America
 
Birds of Europe
Tortonian first appearances